Stephen Huneck (October 8, 1948 – January 7, 2010) was an American wood carving folk artist, furniture maker, painter, and author. Much of his artwork focused on dogs, including The Dog Chapel at his Dog Mountain farmstead.

Biography
Huneck was born in Columbus, Ohio, but grew up in Sudbury, Massachusetts, as one of seven children. Huneck had severe dyslexia, but he found calm in exploring the woods near his home and roughly carving bits of fallen branches. After graduating from Lincoln–Sudbury Regional High School, Huneck moved to Boston at age 17 to attend Massachusetts College of Art, working as a taxi cab driver to pay his bills. He also began finding and restoring antique furniture, beginning with an old chair he noticed had been set out for trash collection. Repairing old wooden pieces helped Huneck develop his skill as a carver.

Huneck met fellow student Gwen Ide in Boston and the pair moved to Maine and then Vermont, settling at the Quarry Hill Creative Center in Rochester, Vermont, where he began to work in wood and continuing to sell antiques. He was discovered in 1984 when Jay Johnson noticed one of his carvings, an angel carved from pine, in Huneck's pick-up truck. Johnson asked Huneck how much he wanted for the angel. Not intending to sell it and believing that the man would not pay such a high price, Huneck told Johnson that he wanted $1,000. Johnson, a Manhattan-based art gallery owner focused on folk art, bought the angel on the spot and then continued to purchase carvings from Huneck.

In 1994, Huneck fell down the stairs at his studio while carrying a large carving, breaking several ribs and suffering a head injury. While in hospital after the fall, he suffered from acute respiratory distress syndrome and ended up in a coma for two months. During his recovery, Huneck found his hands were too weak to carve in his traditional manner, so he began more "gentle" carving, using a mallet and chisel to make woodcuts. The prime subject for these artworks was Sally, Huneck's black lab, who, along with his other dogs, helped encourage him in his recovery.

After recovering from the accident, Huneck purchased the property in St. Johnsbury, Vermont, that would become Dog Mountain in 1995, turning an old barn on the site into his studio. Although it was their home, the Hunecks opened Dog Mountain to the public, inviting people to bring their dogs to two annual gatherings, the Dog Party and Dog Fest, where dogs could run off-leash.

In 1996, for its salute to folk art at the 1996 Olympic Games in Atlanta, The Coca-Cola Co. commissioned a  Coke bottle carving from Huneck, which he capped with a gold-winged cow.

Despite his critical success, Huneck and Dog Mountain suffered financially during the Great Recession and after having to layoff a number of employees, Huneck, who suffered from depression, committed suicide on January 7, 2010, outside his psychiatrist's office in Littleton, New Hampshire.

The Dog Chapel

Huneck began building The Dog Chapel at Dog Mountain in 1997. Huneck described his coma as a "near death experience" during which a dog-headed figure visited him and sold him "a fantastic dog sculpture that seemed to contain the secrets of life itself," inspiring him to build the chapel. The chapel, a replica of a classic white New England country church from the 1820s, took three years to complete. It features carved wooden dogs lining the pews, and dog-themed stained glass windows in its  main room. In addition to standard human sized doors, the chapel has a dog door.

Atop the chapel's steeple is the golden Angel Dog sculpture, a  winged Labrador retriever taking flight. It acts as a fully functional weathervane. Angel Dog fell from the steeple in 2010, but was restored in 2020.

The walls of the chapel are covered with notes of remembrance and pictures of visitors' deceased pets. Outside the chapel is a sign reading "Welcome All Creeds All Breeds No Dogmas Allowed." Friends of Dog Mountain describes the chapel as Huneck's "greatest and most personal artistic contribution" as well as "a living piece of communal art and history, ever evolving with each new note and photo pinned to the memorial walls."

Work
Outside of initial cutting and final sanding, Huneck only used hand tools and, as a self-taught artist, he had an atypical carving style, drawing the blade towards himself. Much of his work is carved from Vermont basswood, along with cherry, maple, and pine, harvested from Dog Mountain.

Pieces of Huneck's artwork are in the permanent collections of the Smithsonian Institution; Currier Museum of Art in Manchester, New Hampshire; the Museum of American Folk Art and American Kennel Club Museum of the Dog in New York City; and Shelburne Museum in Shelburne, Vermont. Huneck also received commissions for works from celebrities and politicians, including Sandra Bullock, Dr. Phil McGraw, and U.S. Sen. Patrick Leahy.

In addition to carvings, Huneck wrote several children's books, the main character of which was Sally. Sally Goes to the Beach spent a week in The New York Times Review of Books children's best-sellers list in 2000, and Huneck earned a silver medal at the Society of Illustrators's The Original Art competition, which honors illustrations from children's books, in 2002 for Sally Goes to the Farm.

List of books
Sally Goes to the Beach (2000) — New York Times best-seller
Sally Goes to the Mountains (2001)
The Dog Chapel: Welcome All Breeds All Creeds No Dogmas Allowed (2002)
Sally Goes to the Farm (2002) — Society of Illustrators Silver Medal
Sally Goes to the Vet (2004)
Art of Stephen Huneck by Laura Beach (2004)
Sally's Snow Adventure (2006)
Sally Gets a Job (2008)
My Dog's Brain (2009)
Sally's Great Balloon Adventure (2010)
Even Bad Dogs Go to Heaven: More from the Dog Chapel (2010)
Sally Goes to Heaven (2014)
Sally in the Sand (2014)

References

External links
Dog Mountain: About the Artist Stephen Huneck
MutualArt
Publishers Weekly Author Page
Dog Mountain: A Love Story (podcast)

Writers from Massachusetts
Writers from Vermont
Artists from Massachusetts
Artists from Vermont
American artists
American male writers
People from Sudbury, Massachusetts
People from St. Johnsbury, Vermont
Suicides by firearm in New Hampshire
1948 births
2010 suicides
Dogs in popular culture